The 32nd Annual Japan Record Awards took place at the Nippon Budokan in Chiyoda, Tokyo, December 31, 1990, starting at 6:30PM JST. The primary ceremonies were televised in Japan on TBS.

Award winners

Pops and Rock
Japan Record Award:
Tetsuro Oda (composer/arranger), Momoko Sakura (Songwriter) B.B.Queens for "Odoru Pompokolin"
Best Pops Vocalist:
Mariya Takeuchi
Best Rock Vocalist:
Southern All Stars
Best Pops New Artist:
Ninja
Best Rock New Artist:
Tama
Best Foreign Artist:
Madonna

Enka and Kayōkyoku
Japan Record Award:
Takao Horiuchi for "Koiuta Tsuzuri"
Best Vocalist:
Nobue Matsubara
Best Kayōkyoku New Artist:
Yang Soo Kyung
Best Enka New Artist:
Saori Hareyama

External links
Official Website

Japan Record Awards
Japan Record Awards
Japan Record Awards
Japan Record Awards
1990